There are over 9,000 Grade I listed buildings in England. This page is a list of these buildings in the City of Westminster.

Buildings

Bayswater

|}

Belgravia

|}

Buckingham Palace complex

|}

Charing Cross / Trafalgar Square

|}

Covent Garden

|}

Hyde Park

|}

Kensington

|}

Kilburn

|}

Maida Vale

|}

Marylebone

|}

Mayfair

|}

Paddington

|}

Pimlico

|}

Regent's Park

|}

St James's

|}

Soho

|}

Strand

|}

Temple

|}

Victoria

|}

Victoria Embankment

|}

Westminster

|}

Abbey Precinct and Westminster School

|}

Whitehall

|}

See also
 Grade II* listed buildings in the City of Westminster (A–Z)
 Grade II* listed buildings in the City of Westminster (1–9)

Notes

External links
 

 
Lists of Grade I listed buildings in London